Achieving Vagueness (#18 Irish Charts) is the title of The Flaws' debut album. It was released on September 14, 2007. The album was originally to be titled Lost in a Scene. It was nominated for the Choice Music Prize for Irish Album of the Year 2007.

Track listing 
 "You & I" – 3:28
 "No Room" – 2:52
 "1981" – 3:12
 "Lost in a Scene" – 3:03
 "Slow Dance" – 5:23
 "Sixteen" – 3:58
 "Idolise" – 3:05
 "Out Tonight" – 3:06
 "Throwaway" – 5:20
 "Windmill Talent" – 5:34

Singles 
 "Sixteen" b/w "Punk" (2007) (#29 Irish Charts)
 "1981" b/w "Lost in a Scene" (2007)
 "You & I" (Download Only) (2007)

References 

2007 debut albums
The Flaws albums
Polydor Records albums